Brenthia hexaselena is a species of moth of the family Choreutidae. It is found in Costa Rica. It is a rare example of a prey animal mimicking its predator.

Mimicry

Adult moths mimic the jumping spider Phiale formosa, one of their predators. The moths lie low with their wings held up facing forward, their coloration, pattern and movement all resembling those of the spider. In an experiment, Brenthia hexaselena and Brenthia monolychna had higher survival rates than other similarly sized moths in the presence of jumping spiders. The jumping spiders responded to Brenthia with territorial displays, indicating that the species were sometimes mistaken for jumping spiders, and not recognized as prey.

References

Moths described in 1909
Brenthia
Articles containing video clips
Mimicry